AS-104 was the fourth orbital test of a boilerplate Apollo spacecraft, and the second flight of the Pegasus micrometeoroid detection satellite. It was launched by SA-8, the ninth Saturn I carrier rocket.

Objectives
The primary mission objective was to demonstrate the launch vehicle's iterative guidance mode and to evaluate system accuracy. The launch trajectory was similar to that of mission AS-103.

The Saturn launch vehicle SA-8 and payload were similar to those of mission AS-103, except that a single reaction control engine assembly was mounted on the boilerplate service module (BP-26). The assembly was instrumented to acquire additional data on launch environment temperatures. This assembly also differed from the one on the AS-101 mission in that two of the four engines were of a prototype configuration instead of all engines being simulated.

Launch
This was the first nighttime launch in the Saturn I series. A built-in 35 minute hold was used to ensure that launch time coincided with the opening of the launch window.

AS-104 was launched from Cape Kennedy Launch Complex 37B at 2:35:01 a.m. EST (07:35:01 GMT) on May 25, 1965. The launch was normal and the payload was inserted into orbit approximately 10.6 minutes after lift-off. The total mass placed in orbit, including the spacecraft, Pegasus B, adapter, instrument unit, and S-IV stage, was 34,113 pounds (15,473 kg). The perigee and apogee were 314.0 and 464.1 miles (505 and 747 km), respectively; the orbital inclination was 31.78'. The 1397 kilogram (3080-pound) Pegasus 2 satellite was also carried to orbit by SA-8, being stowed inside the boilerplate's service module, and remaining attached to the S-IV stage.

The actual trajectory was close to the one predicted, and the spacecraft was separated 806 seconds after lift-off. Several minor malfunctions occurred in the S-I stage propulsion system; however, all mission objectives were achieved.

References

External links

NSSDC: SA-8
Manned space flight network performance analysis for the SA-8 mission

Apollo program
Spacecraft launched in 1965
1965 in the United States
Test spaceflights
Spacecraft launched by Saturn rockets